Jexus Web Server (or simply Jexus) is a proprietary web server developed by Bing Liu. Jexus supports the ASP.NET stack defined by Microsoft by integrating with Mono, as well as PHP via FastCGI.

Its early releases were announced on a CSDN blog. The following releases were announced primarily on its own Chinese forum.

Jexus can be configured by manually editing configuration files. Since March 2014, LeXtudio has been developing a management console to simplify such tasks. The console (aka Jexus Manager) was announced on April 13 officially. This console enables both local and remote management of Jexus web server.

See also
 Comparison of web servers

References

External links

Project Wiki
Jexus Community site
Jexus Manager

web server software
Cross-platform software
Web server software for Linux